The Voice of the Wretched is a live album by doom metal band My Dying Bride, recorded in Tilburg, the Netherlands on the 4 March 2001. Original pressings of the album had tracks 2 and 4 listed in the wrong order, and "Turn Loose The Swans" was spelled "TRUN Loose The Swans".

Track listing
 "She Is the Dark" – 8:40
 "Turn Loose the Swans" – 10:02
 "The Cry of Mankind" – 6:33
 "The Snow in My Hand" – 6:33
 "A Cruel Taste of Winter" – 6:52
 "Under Your Wings and into Your Arms" – 5:28
 "A Kiss to Remember" – 6:55
 "Your River" – 9:06
 "The Fever Sea" – 4:13           
 "Symphonaire Infernus et Spera Empyrium" – 10:35

Credits
 Aaron Stainthorpe - vocals, artwork
 Andrew Craighan - guitar
 Hamish Glencross - guitar
 Adrian Jackson - bass
 Shaun Taylor-Steels - drums
 Yasmin Ahmed - keyboards

References

My Dying Bride live albums
2001 live albums